Cyril Chambers CBE (1897 – 1975) was an Australian politician who served as a member of the House of Representatives from 1943 to 1958, representing the Labor Party. He was Minister for the Army in the Chifley Government from 1946 to 1949.

Early life
Chambers was born in the Adelaide suburb of Thebarton on the 28th of February in 1897. He was educated at St John the Baptist's School, Thebarton, and Hayward's Academy, Adelaide. In 1919 he became a dentist.  He was mayor of Henley and Grange from 1932 to 1934.  In 1938, he married Hilda Dorothy Mummery.  During World War II, he served in the 3rd Field Ambulance in New Guinea, but was soon invalided back to Adelaide.

Political career
Chambers was elected as the Labor member of the House of Representatives seat of Adelaide at the 1943 election and was appointed Minister for the Army following the 1946 election in the second Chifley ministry.  In July 1949 he ordered troops to mine coal in the New South Wales to break a strike by the then communist-influenced Australian Coal and Shale Employees' Federation. The Labor government lost power at the 1949 election.

Chambers' first wife had died in 1943 and in December 1949, he married a divorcee, Salamas Rickman, despite his generally strict Catholicism.  She died in 1954 and in October 1956 he married Janet Sanderson Pullen.  In 1951, he refused to take part in Labor's campaign against the 1951 anti-communist referendum and would have been expelled from the party except for the intervention of party leader H.V. Evatt.

On 8 August 1957, Chambers publicly called on Evatt to resign as party leader, accusing him of "fomenting discord wherever he goes" and of contributing to the party's loss at the 1957 Queensland state election. On 27 August he announced his intention to move a motion of no confidence in Evatt's leadership. However, on 19 September he was expelled from the ALP by the state council of the South Australian branch.

Chambers sat as an independent until 16 June 1958, when he was re-admitted to the Labor Party. By that time Joe Sexton had already won preselection for Adelaide at the 1958 federal election. It was too late for Chambers to nominate for another seat, and he was forced to retire.

Later life
Chambers worked as an immigration selection officer in Belfast, Rome and Scotland from 1959 to 1962 and then worked in Adelaide as a welfare consultant.  In 1968, he was made a Commander of the Order of the British Empire (CBE).  He died in Hawthorn, South Australia, survived by his third wife, but he had no children.

Notes

Australian Labor Party members of the Parliament of Australia
Members of the Australian House of Representatives for Adelaide
Members of the Australian House of Representatives
Members of the Cabinet of Australia
1897 births
Commanders of the Order of the British Empire
1975 deaths
Australian dentists
Independent members of the Parliament of Australia
20th-century Australian politicians
Politicians from Adelaide
Mayors of places in South Australia
20th-century dentists